Porr AG (referred to by the company as PORR AG) is a construction group listed on the Vienna Stock Exchange with its headquarters in Vienna. It is one of the largest Austrian construction companies and is active nationally and internationally in all sectors of the construction industry: from civil engineering including traffic route construction, tunnelling and special civil engineering, to building construction, environmental engineering and facility management.

Today's parent company, PORR AG, was founded in 1869 under the name Allgemeine Österreichische Baugesellschaft as a public limited company, making PORR the oldest listed company in Austria. The name PORR goes back to the construction engineer Arthur PORR, co-founder of A. Porr means porn in Swedish, saying it's a really bad name to still use. PORR Betonbauunternehmung Ges.m.b.H., which merged with the company in 1927.

History 
In 1869, Allgemeine Österreichische Baugesellschaft was founded in Vienna. Its first listing on the Vienna stock exchange was on 8 April 1869. In the 19th century, a number of Vienna Ring Road buildings were erected, such as Haus der Industrie on Schwarzenbergplatz. In 1873, the company built seven exhibition pavilions and numerous hotels for the World Exposition in Vienna.

The merger of the two parent companies to form Allgemeine Baugesellschaft - A. PORR Aktiengesellschaft took place in 1927. In 1930 the company did pioneering work with the construction of the world-famous Grossglockner High Alpine Road. In the period between the wars, PORR was involved in the construction of numerous power plants, road, railway and industrial Buildings.

After the war, the construction of prestigious office and commercial buildings followed, such as the striking Ringturm in Vienna in 1953. PORR also increasingly became a general contractor for large national projects. In the seventies, PORR developed the New Austrian Tunnelling Method, which revolutionised civil engineering worldwide. With the establishment of branches outside Austria, the company positioned itself as an international group that realized construction projects of all types and sizes in Europe and the Middle East. In 1973, the Vienna International Center and UNO City were built, hosting the United Nations offices. In the 1980s the group expanded its activities to Central and Eastern Europe. In 2000, PORR became the majority owner of Teerag-Asdag, the most important road construction company in Austria at the time.

Since September 2010, Karl-Heinz Strauss has been Chairman of PORR. The PORR Group has been comprehensively restructured under his tenure. At the end of 2010, PORR took over the Teerag-Asdag shares from Wiener Stadtwerke and thus became the sole owner. In June 2011, the powerful PORR Bau GmbH was founded; it was created by merging PORR Projekt und Hochbau Aktiengesellschaft with PORR Technobau und Umwelt Aktiengesellschaft.

Since 2012, a syndicate made up of the IGO Industries Group and the Strauss Group has held the majority of shares. The rest are in international free float. In 2013, the company name was changed from Allgemeine Baugesellschaft - A. PORR AG to PORR AG, so that the Group now operates internationally as PORR.

In 2014 the real estate division was spun off and PORR became a pure construction company. In 2016 Teerag-Asdag merged with PORR Bau.

In March 2017, PORR announced the purchase of the Oevermann Group, which belongs to Heijmans.

PORR was listed on the Austrian Traded Index (ATX) for the first time in June 2018.

Corporate structure 
At the top of the PORR Group is PORR AG, an operationally active strategic holding company with a number of staff units. In organisational terms, PORR is divided into three business units. It is managed by members of the Executive Board.

The company is structured into separate business Units:
 Business Unit 1 (BU 1) includes responsibility for Austria and Switzerland as well as PORR Industriebau. In 2019, the Environmental Engineering and Railway Construction including Slab Track Europe business units were added. In addition, investments such as Prajo, TKDZ, Thorn, PWW and ALU-SOMMER are integrated in BU 1.
 Business Unit 2 (BU 2) comprises PORR's activities in Germany and is divided into four regions: South (via Munich), East (via Berlin), West (covered by PORR Oevermann) and North (via Hamburg).
 Business Unit 3 (BU 3) focuses on the home markets of Poland, the Czech Republic, Slovakia and Romania as well as on the project markets of PORR, namely Qatar, the UAE and Norway. Added to this is the Major Projects unit, which covers major slab track infrastructure projects outside Europe.
The remaining holdings are bundled under PORR Beteiligungen und Management, or PBM for short, under the holding Company.

Range of services 
PORR's range of services covers the entire construction value chain. From planning to construction, operations and finally demolition or renovation.

Building Construction 
In the field of building construction, PORR's range of services includes offices, hotels, schools, apartments, administrative buildings, healthcare facilities, industrial plants and football stadiums, as well as the revitalization of architectural gems.

Civil Engineering 
Numerous tunnels, bridges, underground railways, rail track systems, power stations, industrial plants and motorways in Austria and internationally have been realised by PORR. The company holds numerous patents, including some of the most advanced tunnel and railway construction systems as well as special processes for the remediation of contaminated sites and the treatment of hazardous waste.

Infrastructure 
PORR has built a number of infrastructure projects in the course of its history: tunnels, bridges, metros, railways, rail tracks and slab track projects. The areas of power plant construction, foundation engineering, line construction, road and traffic route construction, as well as various major projects in the civil engineering segment complete PORR's infrastructure service Portfolio.

Environmental Engineering 
PORR Umwelttechnik GmbH was founded in 1990 as a subsidiary of PORR in order to bundle the knowledge available in the group in the field of technical environmental protection and to develop and implement innovations in the planning, financing, construction and operation of environmental engineering structures and facilities.

Construction 
Selected projects built by PORR:  
 Multiple tunnels as part of Stuttgart 21 and the new Wendlingen-Ulm line: Boßler Tunnel, Filder Tunnel, Steinbühl Tunnel, Baden-Württemberg (DE)
 Smart Campus: Headquarters of the Vienna Networks (AT)
 Euro Plaza office building, component 4, Vienna - Construction of the 4th section of the modern office park on Wienerbergstraße (AT)
 General renovation of Theater in der Josefstadt, Vienna (AT)
 Application of the "Slab track - elastically supported track supporting slab ÖBB-PORR", Berlin (DE)
 Construction of the Sava Bridge, Belgrade (RS)
 Finne Tunnel, Herrengosserstedt - New construction of two parallel 6970m-long single-track tubes using the shield tunnelling method (DE)
 Construction of the 2nd tube of the 6.4 km-long Tauern Tunnel (AT)
 General rehabilitation of the A1 west motorway in Arge, Upper Austria (AT)
 Motorway A2 Gleisdorf West-Laßnitzhöhe: Execution in joint venture of road construction, bridge renovation and sound barrier works (AT)
 New construction of the "Great Olympic Ski Jump" in a consortium, Garmisch-Partenkirchen (DE)
 Construction of the Albula Tunnel for the Rhaetian Railway (Albulatunnel II), Bergün/Bever (CH)

Shareholder structure 
The voting shares of the Strauss Group and IGO Industries Group are bundled in a syndicate. This means that the majority of votes at the Annual General Meeting are represented as a single entity.

Status: June 2020

References

External links 
 Company page - PORR Group
 Company page - PORR Austria
 Company page - PORR Germany
 World of PORR

Construction and civil engineering companies of Austria
1869 establishments in Austria
Companies based in Vienna
Construction and civil engineering companies established in 1869